The Comptroller and Auditor General (C&AG) in the United Kingdom is the government official responsible for supervising the quality of public accounting and financial reporting. The C&AG is an officer of the House of Commons who is the head of the National Audit Office, the body that scrutinises central government expenditure.

Under the Budget Responsibility and National Audit Act 2011 the C&AG is appointed by the monarch by letters patent upon an address of the House of Commons presented by the Prime Minister with the agreement of the Chair of the Public Accounts Committee. The C&AG can be removed from office, also by the monarch, only upon an address of both Houses of Parliament.

The full title of the office is Comptroller General of the Receipt and Issue of His Majesty's Exchequer and Auditor General of Public Accounts.

The current C&AG is Gareth Davies (not the MP).

History
The office of C&AG was created by the Exchequer and Audit Departments Act 1866, which combined the functions of the Comptroller General of the Exchequer, who had authorised the issue of public monies from the Treasury to other government departments, with those of the Commissioners of Audit, who had presented the government accounts to the Treasury). Under the terms of the Act the C&AG continued to authorise the issue of money to departments, but was also given the new task of examining departmental accounts and reporting the results to Parliament. The role has since been replicated in many Commonwealth and foreign countries.

List of Comptrollers and Auditors General

 1867 - Sir William Dunbar, 7th Baronet
 1888 - Sir Charles Lister Ryan
 1896 - Richard Mills
 1900 - Douglas Close  Richmond
 1904 - Sir John Arrow Kempe
 1911 - Sir Henry James Gibson
 1921 - Sir Malcolm Graham Ramsay
 1931 - Sir Gilbert Charles Upcott
 1946 - Sir Frank Newton Tribe
 1958 - Sir Edmund Compton
 1966 - Sir Bruce Fraser
 1971 - Sir David Pitblado
 1976 - Sir Douglas Henley
 1981 - Sir Gordon Downey
 1988 - Sir John Bourn
 2008 - Tim Burr
 2009 - Sir Amyas Morse
 2019 - Gareth Davies

Devolved administrations

Wales
The Auditor General for Wales is the public official in charge of Audit Wales, the body responsible for auditing the Welsh Government and £20 billion of taxpayers' money each year. It is a statutory appointment made by Her Majesty the Queen, in accordance with the provisions of Schedule 8 to the Government of Wales Act 2006.

Scotland
The first Auditor General for Scotland was Robert Black, who was appointed in February 2000. The post had since been held by Caroline Gardner (July 2012 to July 2020) and Stephen Boyle.

Northern Ireland
The Comptroller and Auditor General for Northern Ireland is the head of the Northern Ireland Audit Office (NIAO), with responsibility for public audit in Northern Ireland.

Other Comptrollers and Auditors General

Bangladesh: Comptroller and Auditor General of Bangladesh
India: Comptroller and Auditor General of India
Ireland: Comptroller and Auditor General (Ireland)
Ghana: Auditor-General of Ghana
New Zealand: Controller and Auditor-General of New Zealand

See also
 Auditor general
 Comptroller

Notes and references

Government audit
Officers of the House of Commons of the United Kingdom
Management occupations
 Comptroller